Christiane Paul (born 8 March 1974 in Berlin-Pankow) is a German film, television and stage actress.

Paul first worked as a model for magazines such as Bravo. She was 17 when she obtained her first leading role in the film . Prior to her acting career (she has no formal acting training), she studied medicine and successfully completed her studies at the Humboldt University of Berlin; however, she gave up medicine in 2006.

Filmography 
(This is a selection, for the full list see )

Audio books (selection) 
read by Christiane Paul:
 Kafka Collection von Franz Kafka, Christiane Paul liest die Erzählung Kinder auf der Landstraße. Patmos audio 2008, .
 Am Weihnachtsabend – Die schönsten Geschichten zum Fest. Christiane Paul liest die Erzählung Die Fähre. von Joan Aiken, Patmos audio 2007, .
 Halbnackte Bauarbeiter. von Martina Brandl, Patmos audio 06/2007, .
 Im Dunkel der Wälder. von Brigitte Aubert, Patmos audio 03/2007, .
 Reliquienblut und Gottesurteil. von Rebecca Gablé, Der Hörverlag 2006, .
 Sigmund Freud: Krankengeschichten, die wie Novellen zu lesen sind. Der Hörverlag 2006, .
 Für immer verzaubert - Die schönsten Prinzessinnen – Geschichten. von Martina Patzer (Hrsg.), Cbj Verlag 2006, .
 Morpheus. von Jilliane Hoffman, Argon Verlag 2005, .
 Wie es leuchtet. von Thomas Brussig, Roof Music 2005, .
 Hans Christian Andersen: Märchen. Hörcompany 2004, .
 Alice im Wunderland. von Lewis Carroll, Roof Music 2003, .
 Die Gesetze. von Connie Palmen, Roof Music 2002, .
 Sandmännchens Geschichtenbuch. von Gina Ruck-Pauquèt, Der Audio Verlag 2009, .
 Sandmännchens Geschichtenbuch 2. von Gina Ruck-Pauquèt, Der Audio Verlag 2009, .
 Puck der Zwerg. von Jakob Streit, Sauerländer audio 2010, .
 Die Lieblingsmärchen der Deutschen. von den Brüdern Grimm und Hans Christian Andersen, Christiane Paul liest drei Märchen, Patmos audio 2010, .

Bibliography 
 Paul, Christiane. Einflussfaktoren auf die perioperative Morbidität und Mortalität in der primären Hüftendoprothetik: eine retrospektive, fallkontrollierte, unselektierte Studie über 628 Implantationen. Dissertation, Humboldt University of Berlin, 2002.

Awards and recognition 
 Max-Ophüls-Preis for Ex – 1996
 Bayerischer Filmpreis for Workaholik – 1996
 Goldene Kamera as Best Upcoming Actress – 1998
Telestar nominated for Best Actress - 1998
Berliner Bär Zeitung Culture prize – 1999
TV-film festival Baden-Baden as Best Actress for Unterm Radar - 2015
 International Emmy Award as best actress for lead role in Unterm Radar - 2016
German Academy Award nominated as Best Supporting Actress - 2017
Order of Merit of the Federal Republic of Germany - 2017

Personal life

Paul was married to physician Prof. Dr. Wolfgang Schwenk from 2002 to 2006. She has a son with Schwenk and a daughter from a previous relationship. Since January 2016 Christiane Paul is married to a German physicist and lives with him in Berlin.

References

External links 
 Official website of Christiane Paul
 
 

1974 births
Living people
Actresses from Berlin
Humboldt University of Berlin alumni
German film actresses
German stage actresses
German television actresses
20th-century German actresses
21st-century German actresses
International Emmy Award for Best Actress winners
Recipients of the Cross of the Order of Merit of the Federal Republic of Germany